The North American Presbyterian and Reformed Council (NAPARC) is an association of several Presbyterian and Reformed churches in the United States and Canada. The Council meets annually.

It lists biblical inerrancy as its basis, along with the Six Forms of Unity: the Westminster Confession of Faith, the Belgic Confession, the Westminster Larger and Shorter Catechisms, the Heidelberg Catechism, and the Canons of Dordt.

The purpose of NAPARC is to "facilitate cross-denominational conversation and co-operation."

History and basis

The first NAPARC meeting was held in Beaver Falls, Pennsylvania in the fall of 1975, and had the Orthodox Presbyterian Church (OPC), the Christian Reformed Church of North America (CRCNA), the Presbyterian Church in America (PCA), the Reformed Presbyterian Church of North America (RPCNA) and the Reformed Presbyterian Church, Evangelical Synod as its founding members. In time, NAPARC would grow to include 12 Continental Reformed and Presbyterian denominations.

In 1997, the membership of the Christian Reformed Church was suspended, largely on the basis of its 1995 decision to open the offices of elder and minister of word and sacrament to women.

The Constitution of NAPARC states that the Basis of the Council is "Confessing Jesus Christ as only Savior and Sovereign Lord over all of life, we affirm the basis of the fellowship of Presbyterian and Reformed Churches to be full commitment to the Bible in its entirety as the Word of God written, without error in all its parts and to its teaching as set forth in the Heidelberg Catechism, the Belgic Confession, the Canons of Dordt, the Westminster Confession of Faith, and the Westminster Larger and Shorter Catechisms.  That the adopted basis of fellowship be regarded as warrant for the establishment of a formal relationship of the nature of a council, that is, a fellowship that enables the constituent churches to advise, counsel, and cooperate in various matters with one another and hold out before each other the desirability and need for organic union of churches that are of like faith and practice."

Purpose and function
Facilitate discussion and consultation between member bodies on those issues and problems which divide them as well as on those which they face in common and by the sharing of insights "communicate advantages to one another" (Institutes IV, 2,1).
Promote the appointment of joint committees to study matters of common interest and concern.
Exercise mutual concern in the perpetuation, retention, and propagation of the Reformed faith.
Promote co-operation wherever possible and feasible on the local and denominational level in such areas as missions, relief efforts, Christian schools, and church education.

Member denominations

References

External links
North American Presbyterian and Reformed Council
Google Map of NAPARC churches

Orthodox Presbyterian Church
Presbyterianism in the United States
Presbyterianism in Canada
Regional councils of churches